Fur is a surname that is a common among some Ashkenazi Jews, originating in Russia. Most of their descendants live in the United States and Argentina.

References 

Jewish surnames
Yiddish-language surnames